Nikitovka is a rural locality (a selo) and the administrative center of Nikitovskoye Rural Settlement, Krasnogvardeysky District, Belgorod Oblast, Russia. The population was 526 as of 2010. There are 12 streets.

Geography 
Nikitovka is located 38 km south of Biryuch (the district's administrative centre) by road. Samarino is the nearest rural locality.

References 

Rural localities in Krasnogvardeysky District, Belgorod Oblast
Valuysky Uyezd